Timmerhuset is a historic log cabin off Jemtland Road in New Sweden, Maine.  Probably built sometime between 1871 and 1875, it is the oldest known surviving example of Swedish immigrant log construction in the state.  It was listed on the National Register of Historic Places in 1973.

Description and history
Timmerhuset is set on knoll overlooking the Little Madawaska River off Jemtland Road in northern New Sweden, a rural community in far northern Aroostook County, Maine.  It is a modest -story log structure, oriented facing south, with a side gable roof that has a small gable centered on the southern face.  It is built out of hand-hewn logs whose sides have been hewn flat, and are joined by notches.  The spaces between the logs would originally have been filled with chinking materials.  To the right of the entrance the roof extends further, creating a shed-like projection that is finished in vertical boards.

The state of Maine in the 1860s authorized a program to recruit homesteaders to some of its rural areas.  Under this program a Swedish population was settled in northern Aroostook County.  Although they were supposed to be provided with tools and a state-built cabin, only six cabins had been built when the first small band of Swedish immigrants arrived in 1870.  Larger groups came in the following years, and it is likely that someone from one of those later groups built this cabin.  It is the only remaining structure in the state that was built by Swedish immigrants that is unambiguously still an early cabin (later examples of Swedish log construction exist, but have generally been incorporated into houses).

See also
National Register of Historic Places listings in Aroostook County, Maine

References

Houses on the National Register of Historic Places in Maine
Houses completed in 1870
Houses in Aroostook County, Maine
Log cabins in the United States
National Register of Historic Places in Aroostook County, Maine
Log buildings and structures on the National Register of Historic Places in Maine